Ogurenkov (masculine) or Ogurenkova (feminine) is a Russian last name, a variant of Agureyev.

People with the last name
Yevgeny Ogurenkov, Soviet boxer who lost to Nikolay Korolyov in 1944

References

Notes

Sources
И. М. Ганжина (I. M. Ganzhina). "Словарь современных русских фамилий" (Dictionary of Modern Russian Last Names). Москва, 2001. 

Russian-language surnames
